Ferribacterium is a genus of bacteria from the family of Rhodocyclaceae which belongs to the class of Betaproteobacteria. Up to now there is only one species of this genus known (Ferribacterium limneticum).

References

Monotypic bacteria genera
Bacteria genera
Azonexaceae
Rhodocyclales
Betaproteobacteria